KBID may refer to:

 Block Island State Airport (ICAO code KBID)
 KBID-LP, a low-power television station (channel 31) licensed to Fresno, California, United States